Jean-Jacques Hobrou Tizié (born 7 September 1972) is an Ivorian former professional footballer who played as a goalkeeper.

Club career
Before moving to Espérance de Tunis, Tizié has enjoyed spells with Lazer FC, Africa Sport and Stade d'Abidjan.

International career
Tizié was the first-choice goalkeeper for the Ivory Coast at the 2006 FIFA World Cup. He won 26 caps.

Background
Before entering the world of football, Tizié was a handball goalkeeper. He is also known for having lost a testicle in a freak accident during a football match.

References

External links

1972 births
Living people
Footballers from Abidjan
Association football goalkeepers
Ivorian footballers
Ivorian expatriate footballers
Ivory Coast international footballers
2000 African Cup of Nations players
2006 Africa Cup of Nations players
2006 FIFA World Cup players
Stade d'Abidjan players
Africa Sports d'Abidjan players
Espérance Sportive de Tunis players
Expatriate footballers in Tunisia
Expatriate footballers in Egypt
Ivorian expatriate sportspeople in Tunisia